The Discovery Institute (DI) is a politically conservative non-profit think tank based in Seattle, Washington, that advocates the pseudoscientific concept of intelligent design (ID). It was founded in 1990 as a non-profit offshoot of the Hudson Institute.

Its "Teach the Controversy" campaign aims to permit the teaching of anti-evolution, intelligent-design beliefs in United States public high school science courses in place of accepted scientific theories, positing that a scientific controversy exists over these subjects when in fact there is none.

The Discovery Institute expresses conservative viewpoints on social issues such as homelessness policy and the COVID-19 response.

History
In 1990, the institute was founded as a non-profit educational foundation and think tank as a branch of the Hudson Institute, an Indianapolis-based conservative think tank. It is named after the Royal Navy ship HMS Discovery in which George Vancouver explored Puget Sound in 1792.

Discovery Institute Press
Discovery Institute Press is the institute's publishing arm and has published intelligent design books by its fellows including David Berlinski's Deniable Darwin & Other Essays (2010), Jonathan Wells' The Myth of Junk DNA (2011) and an edited volume titled Signature Of Controversy, which contains apologetics in defense of the institute's Center for Science and Culture director Stephen C. Meyer.

Physicians and Surgeons for Scientific Integrity
The Physicians and Surgeons for Scientific Integrity (PSSI), formally registered as PSSI International Inc., is a United States 501(c)(3) nonprofit anti-evolution organization, based in Clearwater, Florida, promoting the pseudoscience of intelligent design associated with the Discovery Institute. While in the past, the organization sponsored events promoting intelligent design and fundamentalist Christianity, it is currently largely inactive. The PSSI was established in early 2006 by Rich Akin. Geoffrey Simmons, Discovery Institute fellow, is one of the directors of the PSSI.

The PSSI created a public list of medical professionals who dissent from Darwinism. This list is used by the Discovery Institute in its anti-evolution campaigns. The list is used in support of the Discovery Institute claims that intelligent design is scientifically valid while asserting that evolution lacks broad scientific support.

The PSSI, which was active between 2006 and 2008, held a "Doctors Doubting Darwin" rally at the University of South Florida's Sun Dome in September 2006. Attendance was estimated at 3,500 to 4,000 people by a local reporter. Apologetic organizations promoting the event had hoped to fill all 7,700 seats in the Sun Dome. This meeting featured the Discovery Institute's Jonathan Wells and fellow Michael Behe, and received local radio coverage. This rally was opposed by the organization Florida Citizens for Science.

"Teach the Controversy"

"Teach the Controversy" is a campaign conducted by the Discovery Institute to promote the pseudoscientific principle of intelligent design, a variant of traditional creationism, while attempting to discredit the teaching of evolution in United States public high school science courses.

The scientific community and science education organizations have replied that there is no scientific controversy regarding the validity of evolution and that the controversy is a religious and political one. A federal court, along with the majority of scientific organizations, including the American Association for the Advancement of Science, say the institute has manufactured the controversy they want to teach by promoting a "false perception" that evolution is "a theory in crisis" by falsely claiming it is the subject of wide controversy and debate within the scientific community. In the December 2005 ruling of Kitzmiller v. Dover Area School District, Judge John E. Jones III concluded that intelligent design is not science and "cannot uncouple itself from its creationist, and thus religious, antecedents".

Wedge strategy 

The "Wedge Strategy"  is a  political and social action plan authored by the institute. The strategy was put forth in a Discovery Institute manifesto known as the "Wedge Document". Its goal is to change American culture by shaping public policy to reflect politically conservative fundamentalist evangelical Protestant values. The wedge metaphor is attributed to Phillip E. Johnson and depicts a metal wedge splitting a log. In Why Evolution Works (and Creationism Fails) the authors wrote "Although its religious orientation is explicit, the long-term plan outlined in the Wedge Document also displays the Discovery Institute's political agenda very clearly. In ten years, the Wedge strategy was to be extended to ethics, politics, theology; the humanities, and the arts. The ultimate goal of the Discovery Institute is to "overthrow" materialism and "renew" American culture to reflect right-wing Christian values."

Center for Science and Culture

The Center for Science and Culture (CSC), formerly known as the Center for the Renewal of Science and Culture (CRSC), is part of the Discovery Institute, beside other connected sites, such as Mind Matters, operated by the non-profit Walter Bradley Center for Natural and Artificial Intelligence  at Discovery Institute. It publishes the blog Evolution News & Science Today (formerly Evolution News & Views and often shortened to Evolution News (EN)), that promotes "a rigorously God-centered view of creation, including a new 'science' based solidly on theism."

Other issues

Homelessness 
Christopher Rufo, an activist who later became famous for opposing the teaching of critical race theory, wrote frequently on the subject of homelessness while he worked for the Discovery Institute. In his 2018  Discovery Institute-funded policy paper "Seattle Under Siege: How Seattle's Homelessness Policy Perpetuates the Crisis and How We Can Fix It," Rufo said that four groups"socialist intellectuals", "compassion brigades", the "homeless-industrial complex", and the "addiction evangelists" had successfully framed the debate on homelessness and diverted funding to their projects. He described how the "compassion brigade" had called for social justice using terms such as "compassion, empathy, bias, inequality, root causes, systemic racism." Rufo brought negative attention to All Home, which at the time was King County, Washington's homelessness agency, by sharing a video of an adult entertainer performing at a conference on homelessness. All Home's director was placed on administrative leave and resigned shortly thereafter.

Caitlin Bassett of the Discovery Institute has contributed opinion articles that criticize governmental response to homelessness as wasteful and counterproductive to the goal of ending homelessness. The Discovery Institute opposes the Housing First approach, preferring to prioritize treating homeless people for mental illness or drug addiction.

2020 United States presidential election 
Scott S. Powell, a senior fellow of the Institute, has promoted the false claim that the 2020 United States presidential election was stolen.

Climate change 
The Discovery Institute denies the scientific consensus on climate change.

See also

Creation and evolution in public education in the United States
Timeline of intelligent design

Notes

References

External links

Discovery Institute on C-SPAN

 
Conservative organizations in the United States
Faith and theology think tanks in the United States
Intelligent design movement
Intelligent design organizations
Non-profit organizations based in Seattle
Political and economic think tanks in the United States
Right-wing politics in the United States
Think tanks established in 1990
Pseudoscience